Methylosome protein 50 is a protein that in humans is encoded by the WDR77 gene.

Interactions
WD repeat-containing protein 77 has been shown to interact with CTDP1 and Protein arginine methyltransferase 5.

References

Further reading

External links